Miraj Cinemas is a division of Miraj Entertainment Limited, the entertainment wing of Miraj Group established in 1987 by Madan Paliwal. After production and release of movies like Sona Spa and Madaari, Miraj Group ventured in the cinema exhibition business in 2012 with Miraj Entertainment. After opening four multiplexes in one month in Punjab, Gujarat and Delhi NCR, it currently operates at 50 locations with 144 screens in India, across 14 States and 36 cities.

Other businesses covered by the Miraj Group include tobacco, printing and packaging, foods, pipes and fittings, real estate, retail store chains and shopping malls.

References

External links 
 Official website

Companies based in Mumbai
Privately held companies of India
Cinema chains in India
2012 establishments in Maharashtra
Indian companies established in 2012
Entertainment companies established in 2012